Pieta is a Philippine television daytime drama series that aired on ABS-CBN's Hapontastic afternoon block from October 27, 2008, to May 1, 2009, replacing Ligaw na Bulaklak.

Synopsis
Pieta tells the story of Amanda (Cherie Gil) and her son Rigor (Ryan Agoncillo). Once she discovers that she is pregnant, Amanda struggles to build a better future for her child.

When her son Rigor commits a crime at a young age, Amanda decides to protect him by taking the fall. While she spends many years in prison, Rigor is slowly dragged into a life of violence. Amanda returns home after being released only to see her son turn into her worst nightmare.

Cast and characters

1983 original movie cast
Ace Vergel as Rigor
Charito Solis as Amanda
Vivian Velez as Martha
Luis Gonzales as Delfin
Johnny Wilson as Don Jose/Miguel

Series cast
Main cast

Supporting cast
Jason Abalos as Efren
Erich Gonzales as Ella 
Janus Del Prado as Boyong
Jairus Aquino as Toto
Niña Dolino as Jessa
John James Uy as Frank
Neil Ryan Sese as Geron
Sharlene San Pedro as Kakai
DJ Durano as Kabo
Lyka Ugarte as Helga

Guest cast
Alessandra De Rossi as Young Amanda
Joross Gamboa as Young Delfin
Baron Geisler as Young Miguel
Gemmae Custodio as Young Martha
Nikki Bagaporo as Young Jessa
 Andrew Muhlach as Young Efren
Paul Salas as Young Rigor
Steven Fermo as Young Boyong
Fred Payawan as Young Geron
Tanya Gomez as Irma
Vice Ganda as Tita Ganda
Crispin Pineda as Mang Tomas
Enrique Gil as Harold
Jeffrey Santos as Jake
Lance Raymundo as Turko
Mon Confiado as Lucas
Michael Conan as Exis
Evangeline Pascual as Lilia
Charles Christianson as Tony Boag
Lauren Novero as Toro
Dante Javier as the Barangay Chairman
Ynez Veneracion as Isidra "Ising" Calingasan
Eda Nolan as Young Ising
Jacq Yu as Kai

See also
 List of shows previously aired by ABS-CBN

References

External links
 
 

2008 Philippine television series debuts
2009 Philippine television series endings
ABS-CBN drama series
Philippine action television series
Philippine romance television series
Television shows based on comics
Filipino-language television shows
Television shows set in the Philippines